Maurice Michael Fitzgerald (12 March 1917 – 1 June 1942) was an Australian rugby league footballer who played in the New South Wales Rugby League for Balmain. He died during the Second World War.

Early life and rugby career
Fitzgerald was born on 12 March 1917 in Forest Lodge to Thomas and Dorothy Elizabeth Fitzgerald. He attended Holy Cross College in Ryde from 1933 to 1935, in which time he became the captain of the school's basketball team. In 1936, Fitzgerald appeared 3 times as a loose forward for Balmain, scoring 3 points and 1 try in 3 appearances.

Personal life and military career
Fitzgerald worked as a clerk. During the Second World War, he enlisted in the Royal Australian Air Force in Sydney on 3 February 1941, applying to become aircrew soon after. In May 1941, ranked leading aircraftman, Fitzgerald was transported to Canada under the Empire Air Training Scheme, where he practiced as an observer and air gunner at No.2 Air Observer School, Edmonton. Ultimately being assigned as an observer, Fitzgerald was attached to the Royal Air Force and embarked by ship to England in October 1941, arriving on 1 November.

On 1 June 1942, Sergeant Fitzgerald and the other 5 crew members on board Vickers Wellington Z1311 took off from RAF Breighton to take part in the thousand-bomber raid on Essen. Over Hainaut, German-occupied Belgium, Z1311 was shot down by a German Messerschmit Bf110 night fighter piloted by  Oberleutnant Reinhold Eckardt of Nachtjagdgeschwader 3. The aircraft crashed near Binche, killing all aboard. Originally cited as missing in action, Fitzgerald was declared presumed dead on 26 December 1942. The crew's remains were eventually found, and all were buried at Charleroi Communal Cemetery.

Career statistics

See also
List of solved missing person cases

References

1917 births
1940s missing person cases
1942 deaths
Aerial disappearances of military personnel in action
Australian military personnel killed in World War II
Australian rugby league players
Aviators killed by being shot down
Balmain Tigers players
Formerly missing people
Military personnel from New South Wales
Missing in action of World War II
Missing person cases in Belgium
Rugby league locks
Rugby league players from Sydney
Royal Australian Air Force airmen
Royal Australian Air Force personnel of World War II